Thomas, his wife Margaret, their eldest son Thomas (Junior) and second son, George Angus were members of a Tyneside family who ran a printing and publishing business between 1774 and 1825, very important at the time for the Chapbook business.

Business
The “Angus Family” printing business was founded by Thomas Angus in 1774 and quickly became one of the leading printers of  Chapbooks. He actually employed a young Thomas Bewick from 1774 to 1776. The company occupied premises in The Side, Newcastle.

Thomas (senior) died in 1784 and his widow Margaret took over the running of the business. By the year 1800 the name of the enterprise had been changed to M Angus & Son with son Thomas (Junior) as a partner until his death in 1808.

At this stage the second son George became the junior partner.

Margaret retired  in December 1812 and George continued to run the business, changing the name again to G Angus, until his bankruptcy in 1825, when all his stock was auctioned.

Henry Robson and Robert Emery were at one time apprenticed to the Angus family business.

Works 
These include :-
Thomas (senior) - who printed :
 Numerous street literature and Chapbooks
 the rules of The Philosophical Society of 1775
Margaret - who published :
 Specimens of Wood Engraving by Thomas and John Bewick” (Hugo, 4097)  in 1798
 John Bell’s Rhymes of Northern Bards
 Newcastle Garland c1805
George - who published :
 A Collection of New Song, published c1810 (which included “The Weymouth Frigate”, “William at Eve or William at Eve's Garland”, “Say, Bonny Lass”, “Rat tat too”, “Still from Care and thinking free,” and “Loose every Sail to the Breeze”.

See also 
 Geordie dialect words
 Allan's Illustrated Edition of Tyneside Songs and Readings
 Rhymes of Northern Bards

References

External links
 Bards of Newcastle
 Allan’s Illustrated Edition of Tyneside songs and readings

English music publishers (people)
People from Newcastle upon Tyne (district)
Music in Newcastle upon Tyne
Northumbrian folklore
Geordie songwriters

19th-century British businesspeople